Eday is one of the islands of Orkney, which are located to the north of the Scottish mainland. The bedrock of the island is Old Red Sandstone, which is exposed along the sea-cliffs.

There are various well-preserved Neolithic tombs, as well as evidence of Bronze Age settlement and the remains of a Norse-era castle. During the period of Scottish rule the substantial property of Carrick House was developed at Calfsound, which became a burgh for a short period. During the British era many agricultural improvements were introduced, although there has been a substantial decline in the population since the mid-nineteenth century.  In the twenty-first century the Eday Partnership has had success in promoting the island's economy. Local placenames reflect the diverse linguistic heritage and the landscapes of the island and its surrounding seas attract abundant wildlife.

Geography and geology

The centre of the island is largely moorland covered with heather, and cultivation is confined to the coasts.

The highest points are Flaughton Hill at the island's centre, Fersness Hill at West Side, Vinquoy Hill to the north and Ward Hill to the south, which reaches . In Orkney this last name, which derives from the Norse varði, is a common one for the highest point on an island as in the past they were used for lighting warning beacons.

The largest body of water is the  sea southeast of Vinquoy Hill. Loch of Doomy lies on the western side of the narrow "waist" and the smaller Loch Carrick on the north coast.

The population is dispersed along the coastal farmsteads and nowhere on the island has the status of a village. Calfsound is the most populous of the settled areas, with other concentrations at Millbounds on the east coast, which has a post office and a community facility in a converted chapel, and Backaland in the south where the ferry from the Mainland docks.

Eday is surrounded by other small islands that make up the "seemingly impossible green and russet jigsaw of Orkney's North Isles". Further east is Sanday across the Eday Sound. Stronsay and Linga Holm are to the south east and Muckle Green Holm to the south west beyond the straits known as the Fall of Warness. Egilsay lies some  due west. Rusk Holm, Faray and Holm of Faray lie beyond the Sound of Faray to the northwest, and beyond them is the larger island of Westray.

In common with its neighbouring isles, Eday is largely formed from Middle Devonian Old Red Sandstone deposited in the Orcadian Basin. The Eday Group is the name for a substantial sequence of sandstones that is found at many locations in Orkney, for which Eday and the area around Eday Sound are the type area. The rock is easily quarried and some of the yellow sandstones from Fersness were used in the construction of St Magnus Cathedral in Kirkwall. The Devonian sequence is deformed into a major fold, the north–south trending Eday Syncline, with the youngest part of the sequence, the Upper Eday Sandstone outcropping in the north of the island from Bay of Cusby to Red Head. The oldest part of the sequence, the Rousay Flagstones are found on the eastern side of the island at Bight of Milldale and from Kirk Taing to War Ness, and to the west from Sealskerry Bay to Fersness. Veness is formed of Upper Eday Sandstone downfaulted against the flagstones.

History

Prehistory
The very limited archaeological record provides scant evidence of Mesolithic life in Orkney, but the later assemblage of houses and monumental Neolithic structures in the archipelago is without parallel in the United Kingdom.

The narrow entrance passage of this Maeshowe-type tomb leads to a central chamber with four side-cells. There are two more chambered cairns at Braeside and Huntersquoy and another on the Calf of Eday. Rectangular in shape, it was excavated in 1936–37 and contains a small chamber with two compartments and a larger one with four stalls that has a separate entrance and was probably added at a later date.

Although there are several Bronze Age sites on the island, they provide less dramatic remains. At Warness in the south west there is a burnt mound from this period and there are the ruins of two houses of a similar age on Holm of Faray near the Point of Dogs Bones. The Fold of Setter is an  Bronze Age enclosure located to the north of Mill Loch. There is the site of a large Iron Age roundhouse containing a saddle quern at Linkataing in north west Eday. Latterly, Orkney was settled by the Picts although the archaeological evidence is sparse.

Norse colonisation
It is not known  "when and how the Vikings conquered and occupied the Isles", and although Norse contacts with Scotland certainly predate the first written records in the 8th century,  their nature and frequency are unknown. The place name evidence of a Norse presence on Eday is conclusive and very little is known about the specifics of life on the island at this time. The Norse-era ruins of the Castle of Stackel Brae, which dates from the 12th or 13th century, lie under a green mound to the east of the Bay of Greentoft. The castle may have been the most important building on Eday at this time.

Scottish rule
In 1468 Orkney became part of the Kingdom of Scotland and an influx of Scottish entrepreneurs helped to create a diverse and independent community that included farmers, fishermen and merchants that called themselves comunitatis Orcadie and who proved themselves increasingly able to defend their rights against their feudal overlords. Nonetheless, the actions of the aristocracy continue to provide much of the information known about affairs on Eday at the time. In 1561, during the Reformation, Edward Sinclair was granted the feu of Eday by Adam Bothwell, Bishop of Orkney. These were turbulent times—Sinclair's duties included to defend the reforming Bishop "against whatsoever invaders"—and later that year he was one of the ringleaders of an anti-Catholic riot in Kirkwall.

His son William took over the running of the Eday estate in due course, but it became burdened with debt. In 1601 when Edward was "an auld decrepit man ... aged 100 or thereby" William attempted to sell the family interest to George Sinclair the Earl of Caithness. The new proprietor sent half a dozen boatloads of "vagabondis, broken Highland men of Caithness" to Eday, much to the alarm of the notorious Earl Patrick of Orkney. Earl Patrick was able to use the poor relationship between the elderly father Edward and his son, (the former claiming William fired muskets at him and grabbed him by the neck like a dog) to take action. Acting, so he alleged, on behalf of Edward, Earl Patrick evicted William, took the Eday the rents for himself and profited from the extraction of building stone from Towback quarry.

John Stewart, Earl of Carrick, the brother of Earl Patrick, was granted Eday in 1632  and he constructed Carrick House at Calfsound shortly thereafter. He used peat to manufacture salt from salt pans at both Carrick and on the Calf of Eday. The product was described as "quite fine" in the 17th century when it was undertaken on a substantial scale although of "indifferent quality"  in the early 19th century when it was being conducted as a cottage industry. Peat extraction was also an important industry in the past as Sanday and North Ronaldsay obtained most of their fuel from Eday and this material was also exported to whisky distilleries on mainland Scotland.

Stewart's ambitions for Calfsound were considerable. Described as the "town and port" of Carrick it became a burgh (the only other one in Orkney being Kirkwall) with the right to appoint baillies and hold markets but it was never likely to flourish in such a location.

British era

From the first decade of the 18th century Orkney became part of the new Kingdom of Great Britain. This was a time of great interest in agricultural improvement although the changes this brought about were not of significance in Orkney until the mid-nineteenth century. For example, no potatoes were grown on Eday until around 1780. By comparison to these gradual changes, Carrick House saw drama in 1725. The property was now owned by James Fea who had been a school friend of a "Mr Smith", a trader of Stromness. When Smith was unmasked as the notorious pirate John Gow he sought to escape the attentions of the authorities by making for Eday via a raid on Hall of Clestrain, in Orphir. When Gow's ship Revenge ran aground on the Calf of Eday, Fea's men took him prisoner and held him at Carrick House, for which Fea was given a £1,700 reward. The bell from the Revenge is still in Carrick House.

In the early nineteenth century the kelp industry provided significant employment on some of the Orkney islands, but when the market collapsed between 1830 and 1832 it caused considerable hardship. North Ronaldsay was especially hard-hit and several families were allowed to resettle from there to develop land at Westside on Eday. Rising populations meant increasing land values, especially for small tenancies. However, the 20th century saw decline. Immigration from mainland Scotland was essentially unknown even in the late 1950s and the population in 2001 was about an eighth of the total 160 years earlier.

Etymology

"Eday" is a name derived from the Old Norse eið and means "isthmus island". This is a name specifically associated with economic activity used only where the isthmus has been a "route for the movement of goods and/or boats from one coast to another".

There are numerous other eið names in the islands of the North Atlantic and those in Orkney include Hoxa (Haugeið) on South Ronaldsay, Aith (found on Walls, Stronsay and the west Mainland) and Scapa in St Ola which is derived from the Norse Skálpeið. Bay of Doomy, near the central isthmus on Eday,  may also have a name derived from dómr-eið, meaning "isthmus of the courthouse", indicating it could have been an important meeting place during the Norse period of Scottish history. In the 17th century Eday was also known as "Heth Øy".

In common with elsewhere in the Orkney islands, place names are generally a mixture of Norse, Scots and English influences. Any Pictish names that existed before the arrival of Scandinavian settlers on Eday appear to have been obliterated. The common suffix -quoy is from the Old Norse kví-ló and signifies an enclosure in a marshy area. Skaill on the east coast is from the Norse skáli and suggests an important farm on good fertile land that was associated with several smaller tunships. The Bay of London also has Norse origins, lund-inn meaning "woodland", although this is no longer an apt description for this largely treeless landscape. Old Norse lundi means "puffin", which creatures may once have nested in sandy land at the back of the bay.

Orkney was Christianised before the arrival of Viking settlers, and there are various local "Papa" names that reflect the activities of the pre-Norse papar monks there. The farm of Papleyhouse near Linkataing may indicate such a link to the past, although the connection is by no means certain. The name "geo", which occurs frequently around the rocky coast, is from the Norse gjá and means a narrow and deep cleft in the face of a cliff.

Transport and economy

Eday can be reached by both sea and air from the Orkney Mainland. Orkney Ferries provide daily ferry crossings to Backaland on Eday from Kirkwall. The Orkney inter-island air service, operated by Loganair, connects Kirkwall Airport with Eday London Airport. In 2014 the Orkney Islands Council began consultation to build a number of fixed crossings between seven of the Orkney Islands. This includes the possibility of a 2.6 mile bridge between Eday and Papa Westray.

Farming and crofting are mainstays of the local economy, especially livestock husbandry.  Flocks of sheep are also kept on Faray.

The European Marine Energy Centre (EMEC) based at Stromness is a  Scottish Government-backed research facility. They have installed a wave testing system at Billia Croo on the Orkney mainland and a tidal power testing station, overlooking the Fall of Warness, on Eday. The test site was chosen because of the marine currents that reach almost  at spring tides. There are seven offshore testing berths connected to the 33KV North Isles section of the national grid, via an underground cable.

Eday Partnership, the local development trust is active in promoting the island's economy and has instigated numerous projects, including Eday Heritage Centre, and the purchase of a new diesel tank for the island. Eday's various community projects contributed £380,000 to the island's economy from 2005 to 2007 and a 900 kW community-owned wind turbine is planned. The income that this asset will generate is expected to reduce fuel poverty on the island, support new community enterprises and create affordable housing.

In July 2008, the island celebrated the opening of the Eday Heritage and Visitor Centre in the restored former Baptist Church. There is a heritage display area, a permanent archive, a café and a tourist information point. The Eday Oral History Project records life on the island in the past and is also housed within the centre, which has its own 6 kW wind turbine.

The island's population was 160 as recorded by the 2011 census an increase of over 30% since 2001 when there were 121 usual residents. During the same period Scottish island populations as a whole grew by 4% to 103,702.

Natural history

In the early 19th century Patrick Neill wrote of the local flora that "Eda is a mossy island; a great part of it consisting of barren marshy heaths. Juncus uliginosus here covers whole acres; and the pretty little plant Radiola millegran, or all-seed, is everywhere strewed." Over 120 species of wild plants have been recorded on the island including bog myrtle found nowhere else in Orkney.

In the mid-17th century, Eday was described as being "absolutely full of moorland birds" and today there are red-throated divers on Mill Loch, Arctic skuas and bonxies on the moors and black guillemot offshore. Shore birds include meadow pipit, rock pipit and ringed plover. The woodland at Carrick House attracts a variety of migrants and otters can be seen around the coasts. There are colonies of harbour and grey seals on Muckle Green Holm, Little Green Holm, Faray and Holm of Faray, and white-beaked dolphin, minke whale and killer whale are occasional visitors to the area. A ranger provideds guided walks throughout the year.

Prominent natives
 Australian pioneer union leader and Australian Labor Party politician, William Spence was born on Eday in 1846.
 John Flaws Reid, who represented Mackenzie in the House of Commons of Canada, was born on Eday in 1860.
Rev Norman Miller Johnson FRSE (1887-1949) was minister of Eday and died here in 1949.

See also

 List of islands of Scotland
 List of lighthouses in Scotland
 List of Northern Lighthouse Board lighthouses
 Geology of Orkney
 Prehistoric Orkney
 Tarbert, the Gaelic equivalent of eið

References
Notes

Footnotes

General references

 Anderson, Joseph (Ed.) (1893) Orkneyinga Saga. Translated by Jón A. Hjaltalin & Gilbert Goudie. Edinburgh. James Thin and Mercat Press (1990 reprint). 
 Graham-Campbell, James and Batey, Colleen E. (1998) Vikings in Scotland: An Archaeological Survey. Edinburgh University Press. 

 Irvine, James M. (ed.) (2006) The Orkneys and Schetland in Blaeu's Atlas Novus of 1654. Ashtead. James M. Irvine. 
 Neill, Patrick (1806) A Tour Through Some Of The Islands of Orkney and Shetland, with a view chiefly to objects of natural history, but including also occasional remarks on the state of the inhabitants, their husbandry and fisheries. Edinburgh. Constable and Company.
 Tait, Charles "North Isles - Eday" in The Orkney Guide (2005) Charles Tait Photography. pp. 474–80. 
 Noble, Gordon (2006) Neolithic Scotland: Timber, Stone, Earth and Fire. Edinburgh University Press. 
 Omand, Donald (ed.) (2003) The Orkney Book. Edinburgh. Birlinn.
 Ó Corráin, Donnchadh (1998) Vikings in Ireland and Scotland in the Ninth Century. CELT.
 Thomson, William P. L. (2008) The New History of Orkney. Edinburgh. Birlinn. 
 Waugh, Doreen, "On eið-names in Orkney and other North Atlantic islands" in Sheehan, John and Ó Corráin, Donnchadh (2010) The Viking Age: Ireland and the West. Proceedings of the Fifteenth Viking Congress. Dublin. Four Courts Press. 
 Wickham-Jones, Caroline (2007) Orkney: A Historical Guide. Edinburgh. Birlinn.

External links

 Visit Eday
 Eday Partnership
 RCAHMS aerial photograph of central Eday, showing the narrow isthmus between Sands of Doomy and Bay of London
 Northern Lighthouse Board

 
Islands of the Orkney Islands
Geological type localities of Scotland